Gabinius is a monotypic snout moth genus described by Carl Heinrich in 1956. Its only species, Gabinius paulsoni, described by Émile Louis Ragonot in 1888, is found in Chile.

The wingspan is 20–23 mm. The ground color of the forewings is olivaceous gray, strongly tinted with vinous brown in the dorsal area. The hindwings are translucent, yellowish white with a smoky tint towards the apex and along the terminal margin.

References

Moths described in 1848
Phycitinae
Taxa named by Émile Louis Ragonot
Endemic fauna of Chile